My World, My Way may refer to:

 My World, My Way (album), an album by Silkk the Shocker
 My World, My Way (video game), a role-playing game for Nintendo DS and Sony PSP